Wendy Raymond, Ph.D. is the 16th President of Haverford College. She was formerly Vice President for Academic Affairs/Dean of Faculty and a professor of biology at Davidson College. Her research focus is molecular genetics.

Biography
Raymond is from Mequon, Wisconsin. She earned an undergraduate degree from Cornell University in 1982, where she was elected to Phi Beta Kappa. She received a Ph.D. in biochemistry and molecular biology from Harvard University in 1990.

After an American Cancer Society post-doctoral fellowship at the University of Washington, she became a professor of biology at Williams College in 1994, where she would later be named Associate Dean for Institutional Diversity.

She became provost of Davidson College in 2013 and, in 2014, was appointed chair of the National Science Foundation's Committee on Equal Opportunities in Science and Engineering. She is also a member of the Executive Committee of the organization of Liberal Arts Diversity Officers.

In December 2018, Haverford College named Raymond as its 16th president. She took office on July 1, 2019.

References 

Year of birth missing (living people)
Cornell University alumni
Harvard University alumni
20th-century American biologists
21st-century American biologists
People from Mequon, Wisconsin
Williams College faculty
Davidson College faculty
Women heads of universities and colleges
American women biologists
American molecular biologists
Presidents of Haverford College
Living people
20th-century American women scientists
American women academics
21st-century American women scientists